A council house is a form of public housing in the United Kingdom.

Council house or Council House may also refer to:

Government
 Council House, the administrative headquarters of a British local authority:
 Council House, Birmingham, the home of Birmingham City Council, England
 Council House, Bristol, the former name of the seat of local government in Bristol, England
 Council House, Coventry, the headquarters of Coventry City Council, England
 Council House, Nuneaton, the headquarters of Nuneaton & Bedworth Borough Council, England
 Nottingham Council House, the city hall of Nottingham, England
 Council House (Salt Lake City), temporary home of the Utah Territorial Government, US

Other uses
 Council House, Perth, a skyscraper office building in Australia